Abdulle is both a surname and a given name. Notable people with the name include:

Mohammed Rashad Abdulle (c.1933-2013), Ethiopian scholar
Muse Hassan Sheikh Sayid Abdulle, Somali military leader and politician
Osman Aden Abdulle, Somali scientist
Abdulle Geedannaar, Somali poet